Amalie Zara Benjamin is a writer for the National Hockey League, having previously written for The Boston Globe as a Boston Red Sox beat reporter. She graduated from Northwestern University in 2004 with a degree in English. She lives in the Allston neighborhood of Boston.

Journalism career
Benjamin began her journalism career in 2001, as a stringer for the Community Newspaper Company in Needham, Massachusetts. Over the next three years she interned at the Worcester Telegram & Gazette in Worcester, Massachusetts, The Times-Picayune in New Orleans, Louisiana, and The Washington Post''''.  While in college, she was a contributor and sports editor for the Daily Northwestern’s weekly football magazine, Gameday.

She joined The Boston Globe after graduating from college, and she initially covered high school sports.  After the departure of Chris Snow from the Globe in 2006, she started covering the Red Sox as the backup beat reporter and also worked as a general-assignment sports reporter. When Gordon Edes left in August 2008, the Globe promoted her to Red Sox beat writer. She announced in November 2010 that she had left the position as Globe Red Sox beat reporter and would become a feature writer for the Globe. 

In addition to her columns in the Globe'', Benjamin regularly appeared on the New England Sports Network's (NESN) Red Sox pre-game show to discuss the team.

Benjamin married Kenneth Gantz in 2010, and moved from being Boston Globe's beat writer for the Red Sox to its features writer, to avoid a beat writer's travel after her marriage. The couple separated later. In August 2014, she married Daniel Barbarisi. She also became the beat writer covering Boston Bruins for Boston Globe.

In March 2016, she left Boston Globe to write for nhl.com, the website of National Hockey League.

References

External links
 Amalie Benjamin columns, Boston Globe
Amalie Benjamin bio, Sons of Sam Horn
Amalie Benjamin video clips, NESN
Amalie Benjamin 2007 Red Sox Profiles
Amalie Benjamin NHL.com articles

Living people
Sportswriters from Massachusetts
Writers from Boston
The Boston Globe people
Northwestern University alumni
Women sportswriters
American women sportswriters
21st-century American women
Year of birth missing (living people)